The  is a skyscraper located in Hiroshima, Hiroshima Prefecture, Japan. Construction of the 166-metre, 43-storey skyscraper was finished in 2004.

External links
  

Residential buildings completed in 2004
Buildings and structures in Hiroshima
Residential skyscrapers in Japan
2004 establishments in Japan